Laird Mackintosh (born in Calgary, Alberta) is a Canadian actor based in New York City.

He made his Broadway debut in 2011 in the role of George Banks in Mary Poppins at the New Amsterdam Theater in New York City.

In 2013 he played John Utterson in the Broadway production of Wildhorn's Jekyll and Hyde.

Mackintosh began his career as a dancer in the National Ballet of Canada (1990-1992). He studied at L'Ecole Superieure de Danse du Quebec (Montreal), American Ballet Theatre's School of Classical Ballet in New York City and The National Ballet School in Toronto.

In 1993 he joined the Toronto (LivEnt) production of Andrew Lloyd Webber's The Phantom of the Opera in the role of Porter/Marksman and subsequently went on to play the leading role of Raoul for three years and also to understudy the role of the Phantom.

He performed with Toronto's Opera Atelier between 1997 and 2002. In 2002, Mackintosh joined the company of the Stratford Shakespeare Festival appearing as Freddy Eynesford-Hill in My Fair Lady. He remained with the company for eight seasons, playing many leading roles.
He has also played Robert in The Drowsy Chaperone (Vancouver), Phil Davis in White Christmas (Halifax), Prince Charming in Ross Petty's Cinderella (Toronto), Gustl in The Land of Smiles and Algernon Moncrieff in Earnest, the Importance of Being (Toronto Operetta Theatre).

He played Nicky Goldberg in the independent film Songbird directed by Alex Boothby, Don Giovanni in Avenging Angelo (Sylvester Stallone/Warner Bros.), Young Anwyn Noble in Prince Charming (Martin Short/Hallmark) and Bob Kachler in Rad (Lori Loughlin/Taliafilm).

He played John Utterson in the 2013 Broadway revival of Jekyll & Hyde.

On August 26, 2013, Mackintosh joined the Broadway cast of The Phantom of the Opera as Monsieur André and an understudy for the Phantom. On May 5, 2014, he performed a one-week limited engagement as the Phantom between Hugh Panaro's departure and Norm Lewis' arrival. He concluded his limited run as the Phantom on May 12, and then continued to play Monsieur André until September of 2019.

In December of 2019, he joined the U.S. tour of My Fair Lady in the role of Henry Higgins.

External links
 
 
 Laird Mackintosh: Credits, Bio, News & More | Broadway World
 Jekyll & Hyde Home
 OFFICIAL: Richard White, Laird Mackintosh and Teal Wicks Join Broadway-Bound JEKYLL & HYDE Tour; Complete Cast Announced!

Canadian male musical theatre actors
Male actors from Calgary
Musicians from Calgary
Living people
1968 births